The dorsal cuboideonavicular ligament is a fibrous bundle connecting the dorsal surfaces of the cuboid and navicular bones.

Ligaments of the lower limb